An Audio Guide to Everyday Atrocity is the second album by the Washington, D.C.-based alternative metal band Nothingface. The album was released on September 22, 1998, via DCide/Mayhem Records.

Musical style
The main guitar riff from "I, Diablo" originally appeared in "Prayer", an early Nothingface song from their 1994 demo Braid. The song "Breathe Out" had also been performed earlier in 1997, while the band were touring in support of their debut Pacifier. The album's sound has been compared in the media to bands such as Clutch, Helmet and Pantera, unlike their debut Pacifier, which mainly drew comparisons to the band Korn.

Track listing

Personnel
Matt Holt – vocals
Tom Maxwell – guitar
Bill Gaal – bass, programming
Chris Houck – drums

Singles

References

1998 albums
Nothingface albums